The San Joaquin Parish Church (Spanish: Iglesia Parroquial de San Joaquin), commonly known as San Joaquin Church, is a Roman Catholic Church in the municipality of San Joaquin, Iloilo, Philippines within the jurisdiction of the Roman Catholic Archdiocese of Jaro. It is largely known for its pediment featuring a military scene, the Spanish victory over the Moors in the Battle of Tétouan. The church was declared a National Cultural Treasure by the National Museum of the Philippines.

History 
The construction of San Joaquin Church was completed in 1869 during the Spanish colonization era by Augustinians. The convent of the San Joaquin Church was left in ruins after the World War II leaving its noted well and kiln which were used for baking.

The then National Historical Institute marked the church as a National Historical Site in 1980 pursuant to Presidential Decree No. 260 of 1973 and Presidential Decree No. 375 of 1974.

In the 1980s the church structure underwent renovations. The side and back walls and the altar area was reinforced by cement by local priest which according to heritage conservationists caused the loss of the structure's integrity and authenticity. 

The structure was declared a National Cultural Treasure (NCT) by the National Museum of the Philippines (NMP) in 2001. The declaration also covers the convent ruins of the church complex.

In 2015, a restoration was accomplished on the church building under the watch of the National Historical Commission of the Philippines but the lime plaster or palitada used to cover the facade chipped off in less than a year which led to heritage conservationists criticizing the national heritage body.

Following the declaration of the San Joaquin Campo Santo cemetery as a NCT by the NMP, the heritage organization labels the church complex and the cemetery as the "San Joaquin Church Complex and Campo Santo of San Joaquin, Iloilo".

Just recently, January 19, 2019, the Parish of San Joaquin celebrated the 150th Anniversary of the Church since 1869, the year the church's construction was completed during the time of Fray Tomas Santaren, OSA. The parishioners with the priests assigned helped together to re-enhance the interior design of the church and making all ways of restoring the original designs especially of the tabernacle with its gradas and also of the design of the side retablos. All the designs were carefully made so as to reflect the original designs of the church. The church was solemnly dedicated by His Excellency Most Rev. Jose Romeo O. Lazo, DD last January 18, 2019.

Adjacent to the church, is the new Adoration Chapel which was blessed on the day of the fiesta celebration last January 19, 2019.

Features 

The features of note of the church are its three retablos of carved limestone which were formerly polychromed, the carved pediment which featured the folk portrayal of the Spanish winning over the Moors at the Battle near Tétouan, Morocco as well as its adjacent sprawling ruins where an oven well and kilin for baking can be found.

References

External links 

Roman Catholic churches in Iloilo
National Cultural Treasures of the Philippines
National Historical Landmarks of the Philippines
Spanish Colonial architecture in the Philippines
Churches completed in 1869
Roman Catholic churches completed in 1869
19th-century Roman Catholic church buildings in the Philippines
Churches in the Roman Catholic Archdiocese of Jaro